NACAA may refer to:

 National Association Of County Agricultural Agents (USA)
 National Australian Convention of Amateur Astronomers
 National Association of Clean Air Agencies (USA)